Modern Hebrew is phonetically simpler than Biblical Hebrew and has fewer phonemes, but it is phonologically more complex. It has 25 to 27 consonants and 5 to 10 vowels, depending on the speaker and the analysis.

Hebrew has been used primarily for liturgical, literary, and scholarly purposes for most of the past two millennia. As a consequence, its pronunciation was strongly influenced by the vernacular of individual Jewish communities. With the revival of Hebrew as a native language, and especially with the establishment of Israel, the pronunciation of the modern language rapidly coalesced.

The two main accents of modern Hebrew are Oriental and Non-Oriental. Oriental Hebrew was chosen as the preferred accent for Israel by the Academy of the Hebrew Language, but has since declined in popularity. The description in this article follows the language as it is pronounced by native Israeli speakers of the younger generations.

Oriental and non-Oriental accents
According to the Academy of the Hebrew Language, in the 1880s (the time of the beginning of the Zionist movement and the Hebrew revival) there were three groups of Hebrew regional accents: Ashkenazi (Eastern European), Sephardi (Southern European), and Mizrahi (Middle Eastern, Iranian, and North African). Over time  features of these systems of pronunciation merged, and at present scholars identify two main pronunciations of modern (i.e., not liturgical) Hebrew: Oriental and Non-Oriental. Oriental Hebrew displays traits of an Arabic substrate.
Elder oriental speakers tend to use an alveolar trill , preserve the pharyngeal consonants  and (less commonly) , preserve gemination, and pronounce  in some places where non-Oriental speakers do not have a vowel (the shva na).

Pronunciation of 
Non-Oriental (and General Israeli) pronunciation lost the emphatic and pharyngeal sounds of Biblical Hebrew under the influence of Indo-European languages (Germanic and Slavic for Ashkenazim and Romance for Sephardim).
However, according to Sephardic and Ashkenazic authorities, such as the Mishnah Berurah and the Shulchan Aruch and Mishneh Torah,  is the proper pronunciation. Thus, it is still pronounced as such by some Sephardim and Ashkenazim.

Pronunciation of 
The classical pronunciation associated with the consonant  rêš was a flap , and was grammatically ungeminable. In most dialects of Hebrew among the Jewish diaspora, it remained a flap or a trill . However, in some Ashkenazi dialects of northern Europe it was a uvular rhotic, either a trill  or a fricative . This was because most native dialects of Yiddish were spoken that way, and the liturgical Hebrew of these speakers carried the Yiddish pronunciation. Some Iraqi Jews also pronounce rêš as a guttural , reflecting Baghdad Jewish Arabic.

Though an Ashkenazi Jew in the Russian Empire, the Zionist Eliezer Ben-Yehuda based his Standard Hebrew on Sephardi Hebrew, originally spoken in Spain, and therefore recommended an alveolar . However, just like him, the first waves of Jews to resettle in the Holy Land were Ashkenazi, and Standard Hebrew would come to be spoken with their native pronunciation. Consequently, by now nearly all Israeli Jews pronounce the consonant  rêš as a uvular approximant, which also exists in Yiddish.

Many Jewish immigrants to Israel spoke a variety of Arabic in their countries of origin, and pronounced the Hebrew rhotic consonant  as an alveolar trill, identical to Arabic  , and which followed the conventions of old Hebrew. In modern Ashkenazi, Sephardi, and Mizrahi poetry and folk music, as well as in the standard (or "standardised") Hebrew used in the Israeli media, an alveolar rhotic is sometimes used.

Consonants
The following table lists the consonant phonemes of Israeli Hebrew in IPA transcription:

* Phoneme was introduced through loanwords.
Some older Mizrahi speakers still separate these (as explained above).
2 The glottal consonants tend to be elided, which is most common in unstressed syllables. In informal speech it may occur in stressed syllables as well, whereas careful or formal speech may retain them in all positions. Again, some speakers still separate these.
3  is usually pronounced as a uvular approximant , and sometimes as a uvular  or alveolar trill  or alveolar flap , depending on the background of the speaker. Nurit Dekel (2014) gives an additional alternative velar fricative .

For many young speakers, obstruents assimilate in voicing. Voiceless obstruents (stops/affricates  and fricatives ) become voiced when they appear immediately before voiced obstruents, and vice versa. For example:

   >  ('to close'),  > 
   >  ('a right'),  > 
   >  ('a bill'),  > 
   >  ('a printer'),  > 
   >  ('security'),  > 

 is pronounced  before velar consonants.

Illustrative words

Historical sound changes
Standard Israeli Hebrew (SIH) phonology, based on the Sephardic Hebrew pronunciation tradition, has a number of differences from Biblical Hebrew (BH) and Mishnaic Hebrew (MH) in the form of splits and mergers.
 BH/MH  and  merged into SIH .
 BH/MH  and  merged into SIH .
 BH/MH  and  generally merge into SIH  or became silent, but the distinction is maintained in the speech of older Sephardim and is reintroduced in the speech of some other speakers.
The  allophone merged with  into SIH . A new phoneme  was introduced in loanwords (see Hebrew vav as consonant), so SIH has phonemic .
 BH/MH  de-pharyngealized and affricated to SIH .
 BH/MH  backed to SIH , the former pronunciation is still used by Sephardi and Mizrahi speakers.

Spirantization
The consonant pairs – (archaically ), – (archaically ), and – (archaically ) were historically allophonic, as a consequence of a phenomenon of spirantisation known as begadkefat under the influence of the Aramaic language on BH/MH. In Modern Hebrew, the above six sounds are phonemic.

The full inventory of Hebrew consonants which undergo and/or underwent spirantisation are:

However, the above-mentioned allophonic alternation of BH/MH –, – and – was lost in Modern Hebrew, with these six allophones merging into simple .

Spirantization still occurs in verbal and nominal derivation, but now the alternations –, –, and – are phonemic rather than allophonic.

Loss of final H consonant 
In Traditional Hebrew words can end with an H consonant, e.g. when the suffix "-ah" is used, meaning "her" (see Mappiq). The final H sound is hardly ever pronounced in Modern Hebrew. However, the final H with Mappiq still retains the guttural characteristic that it should take a patach and render the pronunciation /a(h)/ at the end of the word, for example, גָּבוֹהַּ gavoa(h) ("height").

Vowels

Modern Hebrew has a simple five-vowel system.

Long vowels may occur where two identical vowels were historically separated by a pharyngeal or glottal consonant (this separation is preserved in writing, and is still pronounced by some), and the second was not stressed. (Where the second was stressed, the result is a sequence of two short vowels.) They also often occur when morphology brings two identical vowels together, but they are not predictable in that environment.

Any of the five short vowels may be realized as a schwa  when far from lexical stress.

Vowel length
In Biblical Hebrew, each vowel had three forms: short, long and interrupted. However, there is no audible distinction between the three in Modern Hebrew, except that  is often pronounced  as in Ashkenazi Hebrew.

Vowel length in Modern Hebrew is environmentally determined and not phonemic, it tends to be affected by the degree of stress, and pretonic lengthening may also occur, mostly in open syllables. When a glottal is lost, a two-vowel sequence arises, and they may be merged into a single long vowel:

   ('you will work') > 
   ('you [singular female] bring') > 
 Compare   ('you [singular male] bring').
   ('the closet) > 
 Compare   ('[a] closet').

Shva

Modern pronunciation does not follow traditional use of the niqqud (diacritic) "shva". In Modern Hebrew, words written with a shva may be pronounced with either  or without any vowel, and this does not correspond well to how the word was pronounced historically. An epenthetic  appears when necessary to avoid violating a phonological constraint, such as between two consonants that are identical or differ only in voicing (e.g. Guttural consonants (א, ה, ח, ע) rarely take a shva. Instead, they can take reduced segol (חֱ), reduced patach (חֲ), or reduced kamatz (חֳ).

Stress
Stress is phonemic in Modern Hebrew. There are two frequent patterns of lexical stress, on the last syllable ( מִלְּרַע) and on the penultimate syllable ( מִלְּעֵיל). Final stress has traditionally been more frequent, but in the colloquial language many words are shifting to penultimate stress. Contrary to the prescribed standard, some words exhibit stress on the antepenultimate syllable or even farther back. This often occurs in loanwords, e.g.   ('politics'), and sometimes in native colloquial compounds, e.g.   ('somehow'). Colloquial stress has often shifted from the last syllable to the penultimate, e.g.  'hat', normative , colloquial ;  ('dovecote'), normative , colloquial . This shift is common in the colloquial pronunciation of many personal names, for example  ('David'), normative , colloquial .

Historically, stress was predictable, depending on syllable weight (that is, vowel length and whether a syllable ended with a consonant). Because spoken Israeli Hebrew has lost gemination (a common source of syllable-final consonants) as well as the original distinction between long and short vowels, but the position of the stress often remained where it had been, stress has become phonemic, as the following table illustrates. Phonetically, the following word pairs differ only in the location of the stress; orthographically they differ also in the written representation of vowel length of the vowels (assuming the vowels are even written):

Morphophonology
In fast-spoken colloquial Hebrew, when a vowel falls beyond two syllables from the main stress of a word or phrase, it may be reduced or elided. For example:

 >  ('that is to say')

 >  (what's your name, lit. 'How are you called?')

When  follows an unstressed vowel, it is sometimes elided, possibly with the surrounding vowels:

 >  ('your father')

 >  ('he will give you')

Syllables  drop before  except at the end of a prosodic unit:

 >  ('usually')
but:   ('he is on his way') at the end of a prosodic unit.

Sequences of dental stops reduce to a single consonant, again except at the end of a prosodic unit:

 >  ('I once studied')
but:   ('that I studied')

Notes

References
 
 
 

Phonology
Afroasiatic phonologies